Sea Urchins  was a kidult television series (in three series) produced by Television New Zealand from 1980 to 1984. It starred Rebecca Gibney in her first television role, Bruce Allpress, John Bach, Roy Billing and Robert Rakete.

Described as a saltwater Swallows and Amazons, it was shot on the Mahurangi Harbour near Puhoi in the Hauraki Gulf, where the plucky “urchins” stumble on villainous plots from missing treasure to wildlife smuggling while holidaying with their uncle.

References

External links 
 Sea Urchins at NZonScreen (with video extracts)

1980 New Zealand television series debuts
1984 New Zealand television series endings
1980s New Zealand television series
TVNZ 1 original programming
Television shows set in New Zealand
New Zealand children's television series
Children's adventure television series